The Vatsimanyoki is a river in the south of the Murmansk Oblast, Russia. The Vatsimanyoki flows into the Tuntsayoki.

References

Rivers of Murmansk Oblast